John Masters was a writer.

John Masters may also refer to:

John H. Masters (1913–1987), United States Marine Corps general
Jack Masters (John Masters, born 1931), Canadian politician

See also
John Master (disambiguation)